John Dodderidge may refer to:

 John Doddridge (1555–1628), English lawyer and politician
 John Dodderidge (died 1659) (1610–1659), English lawyer and politician